Dionysius (died 1591) was the Metropolitan of Moscow and all Rus' from 1581 to 1587. He was the sixteenth Metropolitan in Moscow to be appointed without the approval of the Ecumenical Patriarch of Constantinople as had been the norm.

Dionysius was selected as metropolitan by Ivan IV in 1581. He was notable for his eloquence and a number of works (all of them lost), for which he would be nicknamed Грамматик (The Grammarian). Being a close friend of the Shuisky family, Dionysius managed to reconcile them with the Godunovs in 1585. At the same time, he attempted to persuade tsar Feodor I to divorce Irina Godunova. For this, he was deposed at the instigation of Boris Godunov in 1587 and was exiled to the Khutyn Monastery outside Novgorod the Great. He died there in 1591.

Metropolitans of Kiev and all Rus' (Patriarchate of Moscow)
1591 deaths
Year of birth unknown
16th-century Eastern Orthodox bishops